</noinclude>

The Mount Erebus disaster occurred on 28 November 1979 when Air New Zealand Flight 901 (TE-901) flew into Mount Erebus on Ross Island, Antarctica, killing all 237 passengers and 20 crew on board. Air New Zealand had been operating scheduled Antarctic sightseeing flights since 1977. This flight was supposed to leave Auckland Airport in the morning and spend a few hours flying over the Antarctic continent, before returning to Auckland in the evening via Christchurch.

The initial investigation concluded the accident was caused primarily by pilot error, but public outcry led to the establishment of a Royal Commission of Inquiry into the crash. The commission, presided over by Justice Peter Mahon QC, concluded that the accident was primarily caused by a correction made to the coordinates of the flight path the night before the disaster, coupled with a failure to inform the flight crew of the change, with the result that the aircraft, instead of being directed by computer down McMurdo Sound (as the crew had been led to believe), was instead rerouted to a path toward Mount Erebus. Justice Mahon's report accused Air New Zealand of presenting "an orchestrated litany of lies", and this led to changes in senior management at the airline. The Privy Council later ruled that the finding of a conspiracy was a breach of natural justice and not supported by the evidence.

The accident is the deadliest accident in the history of Air New Zealand and one of New Zealand's deadliest peacetime disasters.

Flight and aircraft 
The flight was designed and marketed as a unique sightseeing experience, carrying an experienced Antarctic guide, who pointed out scenic features and landmarks using the aircraft public-address system, while passengers enjoyed a low-flying sweep of McMurdo Sound. The flights left and returned to New Zealand the same day.

Tickets for the November 1979 flights cost NZ$359 per person (equivalent to $2,977 in March 2022).

Dignitaries including Sir Edmund Hillary had acted as guides on previous flights. Hillary was scheduled to act as the guide for the fatal flight of 28 November 1979, but had to cancel because of other commitments. His long-time friend and climbing companion, Peter Mulgrew, stood in as guide.

The flights usually operated at about 85% of capacity; the empty seats, usually the ones in the centre row, allowed passengers to move more easily about the cabin to look out of the windows.

The aircraft used on the Antarctic flights were Air New Zealand's eight McDonnell Douglas DC-10-30 trijets. The aircraft on 28 November was registered ZK-NZP.
The 182nd DC-10 to be built, and the fourth DC-10 to be introduced by Air New Zealand, ZK-NZP was handed over to the airline on 12 December 1974 at McDonnell Douglas's Long Beach plant. It had logged more than 20,700 flight hours prior to the crash.

Captain Thomas James "Jim" Collins (45) was an experienced pilot who had accumulated 11,151 flight hours, including 2,872 hours in the DC-10. First Officer Gregory Mark "Greg" Cassin (37) had accumulated 7,934 flight hours, including 1,361 in the DC-10. Flight Engineer Gordon Barrett Brooks (43) had 10,886 flight hours, including 3,000 in the DC-10. Also on board were First Officer Graham Neville Lucas (39) and Flight Engineer Nicholas John "Nick" Moloney (44). Flight Engineer Moloney had a total of 6,468 flight hours, including 1,700 in the DC-10.

Accident

Circumstances surrounding the accident 
Captain Collins and his co-pilot Cassin had never flown to Antarctica before (while flight engineer Brooks had flown to Antarctica only once previously), but they were experienced pilots and were considered qualified for the flight. On 9 November, 1979, 19 days before departure, the two pilots attended a briefing in which they were given a copy of the previous flight's flight plan.

The flight plan had been approved in 1977 by the Civil Aviation Division of the New Zealand Department of Transport and was along a track directly from Cape Hallett to the McMurdo non-directional beacon (NDB), which, coincidentally, entailed flying almost directly over the  peak of Mount Erebus. The majority of the previous 13 flights had also entered this flight plan's coordinates into their aircraft inertial navigational system and flown the McMurdo Sound route, unaware that the route flown did not correspond with the approved route.

After his flight, Captain Simpson advised Air New Zealand's navigation section of the difference in positions. For reasons that were disputed, this triggered Air New Zealand's navigation section to update the McMurdo waypoint coordinates stored in the ground computer to correspond with the coordinates of the McMurdo TACAN beacon, despite this also not corresponding with the approved route.

Crucially, the flight crew of Flight 901 was not notified of the change. The flight plan printout given to the crew on the morning of the flight, which was subsequently entered by them into the aircraft's INS, differed from the flight plan presented at the 9 November briefing and from Captain Collins' map mark-ups, which he had prepared the night before the fatal flight.

The computer program was altered such that the standard telex forwarded to US air traffic controllers (ATCs) at the United States Antarctic science facility at McMurdo Station displayed the word "McMurdo", rather than the coordinates of latitude and longitude, for the final waypoint. During the subsequent inquiry, Justice Mahon concluded that this was a deliberate attempt to conceal from the United States authorities that the flight plan had been changed, and probably because it was known that US Air Traffic Control would lodge an objection to the new flight path.

The flight had earlier paused during the approach to McMurdo Sound to carry out a descent, via a figure-eight manoeuvre, through a gap in the low cloud base (later estimated to be at around ) while over water to establish visual contact with surface landmarks and give the passengers a better view. Photographs and news stories from previous flights showed that many of these had been flown at levels substantially below the route's MSA. In addition, preflight briefings for previous flights had approved descents to any altitude authorised by the US ATC at McMurdo Station. The radar equipment did not pick up the aircraft, however, and the crew also experienced difficulty establishing VHF communications. The distance-measuring equipment did not lock onto the McMurdo Tactical Air Navigation System (TACAN) for any useful period.

Cockpit voice recorder (CVR) transcripts from the last minutes of the flight before impact with Mount Erebus indicated that the flight crew believed they were flying over McMurdo Sound, well to the west of Mount Erebus and with the Ross Ice Shelf visible on the horizon, when in reality they were flying directly toward the mountain. Despite most of the crew being engaged in identifying visual landmarks at the time, they never perceived the mountain directly in front of them.

Changes to the coordinates and departure 
Unknown to them, the coordinates had been modified earlier that morning to correct the error introduced previously and undetected until then.
The crew evidently did not check the destination waypoint against a topographical map (as did Captain Simpson on the flight of 14 November) or they would have noticed the change. Charts for the Antarctic were not available to the pilot for planning purposes, being withheld until the flight was about to depart. The charts eventually provided, which were carried on the aircraft, were neither comprehensive enough nor large enough in scale to support detailed plotting.

The coordinates programmed the plane to overfly Mount Erebus, a  volcano, instead of down McMurdo Sound.

Collins believed the plane was over open water.

Crash into Mount Erebus 

Outside, a layer of clouds blended with the white snow-covered volcano, forming a sector whiteout – no contrast between ground and sky was visible to the pilots. The effect deceived everyone on the flight deck, making them believe that the white mountainside was the Ross Ice Shelf, a huge expanse of floating ice derived from the great ice sheets of Antarctica, which was in fact now behind the mountain. As it was little understood, even by experienced polar pilots, Air New Zealand had provided no training for the flight crew on the sector whiteout phenomenon. Consequently, the crew thought they were flying along McMurdo Sound, when they were actually flying over Lewis Bay in front of Mount Erebus.

At 12:49 pm, the ground proximity warning system (GPWS) began sounding a series of "whoop, whoop, pull up" alarms, warning that the plane was dangerously close to terrain. The CVR recorded the following:

 GPWS: "Whoop whoop. Pull up. Whoop whoop..."
 F/E: "Five hundred feet."
 GPWS: "...Pull up."
 F/E: "Four hundred feet."
 GPWS: "Whoop, whoop. Pull up. Whoop whoop. Pull up."
 CA: "Go-around power please."
 GPWS: "Whoop, whoop. Pull-"
 CAM: [Sound of impact]
 End of recording.

The pilots had begun a terrain escape manoeuvre by applying full (go-around) power, but it was too late. Six seconds later, the plane crashed into the side of Mount Erebus and exploded, instantly killing everyone on board.

McMurdo Station attempted to contact the flight after the crash, and informed Air New Zealand headquarters in Auckland that communication with the aircraft had been lost. United States search-and-rescue personnel were placed on standby.

Nationalities of passengers and crew
Air New Zealand had not lost any passengers to an accident or incident until this event took place. The nationalities of the passengers and crew included:

Rescue and recovery

Initial search and discovery 
At 2:00 pm, the United States Navy released a situation report stating:

Air New Zealand Flight 901 has failed to acknowledge radio transmissions. ... Also, six aircraft had been launched to find the flight.

Flight 901 was due to arrive back at Christchurch at 6:05 pm for a stopover including refuelling and a crew change before completing the journey back to Auckland. Around 50 passengers were also supposed to disembark at Christchurch. Airport staff initially told the waiting families that the flight being slightly late was not unusual, but as time went on, it became clear that something was wrong.

At 9:00 pm, about half an hour after the plane would have run out of fuel, Air New Zealand informed the press that it believed the aircraft to be lost. Rescue teams searched along the assumed flight path, but found nothing. At 12:55 am, the crew of a United States Navy aircraft discovered unidentified debris along the side of Mount Erebus. No survivors could be seen. Around 9:00 am, 20 hours after the crash, helicopters with search parties managed to land on the side of the mountain. They confirmed that the wreckage was that of Flight 901 and that all 237 passengers and 20 crew members had been killed.

The vertical stabiliser section of the plane, with the koru logo clearly visible, was found in the snow. Bodies and fragments of the aircraft were flown back to Auckland for identification. The remains of 44 of the victims were not individually identified. A funeral was held for them on 22 February 1980.

Operation Overdue

The recovery effort of Flight 901 was called "Operation Overdue.”

Efforts for recovery were extensive, owing in part to the pressure from Japan, as 24 passengers had been Japanese. The operation lasted until 9 December 1979, with up to 60 recovery workers on site at a time.
A team of New Zealand Police officers and a mountain-face rescue team were dispatched on a No. 40 Squadron C-130 Hercules aircraft.

The job of individual identification took many weeks, and was largely done by teams of pathologists, dentists, and police. The mortuary team was led by Inspector Jim Morgan, who collated and edited a report on the recovery operation. Recordkeeping had to be meticulous because of the number and fragmented state of the human remains that had to be identified to the satisfaction of the coroner. The exercise resulted in 83% of the deceased passengers and crew eventually being identified, sometimes from evidence such as a finger capable of yielding a print, or keys in a pocket.

In 2006, the New Zealand Special Service Medal (Erebus) was instituted to recognise the service of New Zealanders, and citizens of the United States of America and other countries, who were involved in the body recovery, identification, and crash investigation phases of Operation Overdue. On 5 June 2009, the New Zealand government recognised some of the Americans who assisted in Operation Overdue during a ceremony in Washington, DC. A total of 40 Americans, mostly Navy personnel, are eligible to receive the medal.

 Accident inquiries 

Despite Flight 901 crashing in one of the most isolated parts of the world, evidence from the crash site was extensive. Both the cockpit voice recorder and the flight data recorder were in working order and able to be deciphered. Extensive photographic footage from the moments before the crash was available; being a sightseeing flight, most passengers were carrying cameras, from which the majority of the film could be developed.

 Official accident report 
The accident report compiled by New Zealand's chief inspector of air accidents, Ron Chippindale, was released on 12 June 1980. It cited pilot error as the principal cause of the accident and attributed blame to the decision of Collins to descend below the customary minimum altitude level, and to continue at that altitude when the crew was unsure of the plane's position. The customary minimum altitude prohibited descent below  even under good weather conditions, but a combination of factors led the captain to believe the plane was over the sea (the middle of McMurdo Sound and few small low islands), and previous Flight 901 pilots had regularly flown low over the area to give passengers a better view, as evidenced by photographs in Air New Zealand's own travel magazine and by first-hand accounts of personnel based on the ground at NZ's Scott Base.

 Mahon inquiry 
In response to public demand, the New Zealand government announced a further one-man Royal Commission of Inquiry into the accident, to be performed by Justice Peter Mahon. This Royal Commission was initially handicapped in that the deadline was extremely short; originally set for 31 October 1980, it was subsequently extended four times.

Mahon's report, released on 27 April 1981, cleared the crew of blame for the disaster. Mahon said the single, dominant, and effective cause of the crash was Air New Zealand's alteration of the flight plan waypoint coordinates in the ground navigation computer without advising the crew. The new flight plan took the aircraft directly over the mountain, rather than along its flank. Due to whiteout conditions, "a malevolent trick of the polar light", the crew were unable to visually identify the mountain in front of them. Furthermore, they may have experienced a rare meteorological phenomenon called sector whiteout, which creates the visual illusion of a flat horizon far in the distance. A very broad gap between cloud layers appeared to allow a view of the distant Ross Ice Shelf and beyond. Mahon noted that the flight crew, with many thousands of hours of flight time between them, had considerable experience with the extreme accuracy of the aircraft's inertial navigation system.

In his report, Mahon found that airline executives and senior pilots had engaged in a conspiracy to whitewash the inquiry, accusing them of "an orchestrated litany of lies" by covering up evidence and lying to investigators. Mahon found that, in the original report, Chippindale had a poor grasp of the flying involved in jet-airline operation, as he (and the New Zealand CAA in general) was typically involved in investigating simple light aircraft crashes. Chippindale's investigation techniques were revealed as lacking in rigour, which allowed errors and avoidable gaps in knowledge to appear in reports. Consequently, Chippindale entirely missed the importance of the flight-plan change and the rare meteorological conditions of Antarctica. Had the pilots been informed of the flight plan change, the crash would have been avoided.

Court proceedings

 Judicial review 
On 20 May 1981, Air New Zealand applied to the High Court of New Zealand for judicial review of Mahon's order that it pay more than half the costs of the Mahon inquiry, and for judicial review of some of the findings of fact Mahon had made in his report.  The application was referred to the Court of Appeal, which unanimously set aside the costs order. The Court of Appeal, by majority, though, declined to go any further, and in particular, declined to set aside Mahon's finding that members of the management of Air New Zealand had conspired to commit perjury before the inquiry to cover up the errors of the ground staff.

 Privy Council appeal 
Mahon then appealed to the Privy Council in London against the Court of Appeal's decision. His findings as to the cause of the accident, namely reprogramming of the aircraft's flight plan by the ground crew, who then failed to inform the flight crew, had not been challenged before the Court of Appeal,  so were not challenged before the Privy Council. His conclusion that the crash was the result of the aircrew being misdirected as to their flight path, not due to pilot error, therefore remained.

Regarding the issue of Air New Zealand stating a minimum altitude of 6,000 feet for pilots in the vicinity of McMurdo Base, the Privy Council stated, 

However, the Law Lords of the Privy Council under the chair of Lord Diplock effectively agreed with some of the views of the minority in the Court of Appeal in concluding that Mahon had acted in breach of natural justice by finding that Air New Zealand management had been engaged in a conspiracy, an accusation which they determined was not supported by the evidence. In its judgment, delivered on 20 October 1983, the Privy Council therefore dismissed Mahon's appeal. Aviation researcher John King wrote in his book New Zealand Tragedies, Aviation:

"Exhibit 164" was a photocopied diagram of McMurdo Sound showing a southbound flight path passing west of Ross Island and a northbound path passing the island on the east. The diagram did not extend sufficiently far south to show where, how, or even if they joined, and left the two paths disconnected. Evidence had been given to the effect that the diagram had been included in the flight crew's briefing documentation.

 Legacy of the disaster 
The crash of Flight 901 is one of New Zealand's three deadliest disasters – the others being the 1874 Cospatrick sailing ship disaster in which 470John Wilson, The voyage out – Fire on the Cospatrick , from Te Ara: The Encyclopedia of New Zealand. Updated 2007-09-21. Accessed 2008-05-20. people died, and the 1931 Hawke's Bay earthquake, which killed 256 people. At the time of the disaster, it was the -deadliest air crash of all time. , the crash remains Air New Zealand's deadliest accident, as well as New Zealand's deadliest peacetime disaster (excluding the Cospatrick sailing ship disaster, which happened en route to Auckland).

Flight 901, in conjunction with the crash of American Airlines Flight 191 in Chicago six months earlier (25 May), severely hurt the reputation of the McDonnell Douglas DC-10. Following the Chicago crash, the FAA withdrew the DC-10's type certificate on 6 June, which grounded all U.S.-registered DC-10s and forbade any foreign government that had a bilateral agreement with the United States regarding aircraft certifications from flying their DC-10s, which included Air New Zealand's seven DC-10s. The Air New Zealand DC-10 fleet was grounded until the FAA measures were rescinded five weeks later, on 13 July, after all carriers had completed modifications that responded to issues discovered from the American Airlines Flight 191 incident.

Flight 901 was the third-deadliest accident involving a DC-10, following Turkish Airlines Flight 981 and American Airlines Flight 191. The event marked the beginning of the end for Air New Zealand's DC-10 fleet, although talk existed before the accident of replacing the aircraft; DC-10s were replaced by Boeing 747s from mid-1981, and the last Air New Zealand DC-10 flew in December 1982. The occurrence also spelled the end of commercially operated Antarctic sightseeing flights – Air New Zealand cancelled all its Antarctic flights after Flight 901, and Qantas suspended its Antarctic flights in February 1980, only returning on a limited basis again in 1994.

Almost all of the aircraft's wreckage still lies where it came to rest on the slopes of Mount Erebus, as both its remote location and its weather conditions can hamper any further recovery operations. During the cold periods, the wreckage is buried under a layer of snow and ice. During warm periods, when snow recedes, it is visible from the air.

Following the incident, all charter flights to Antarctica from New Zealand ceased, and were not resumed until 2013, when a Boeing 747-400 chartered from Qantas set off from Auckland for a sightseeing flight over the continent.

Justice Mahon's report was finally tabled in Parliament by the then-Minister of Transport, Maurice Williamson, in 1999.

In the New Zealand Queen's Birthday Honours list in June 2007, Captain Gordon Vette was awarded the ONZM (Officer of the New Zealand Order of Merit), recognising his services in assisting Justice Mahon during the Erebus inquiry. Vette's book, Impact Erebus, provides a commentary of the flight, its crash, and the subsequent investigations.

In 2008, Justice Mahon was posthumously awarded the Jim Collins Memorial Award by the New Zealand Airline Pilots Association for exceptional contributions to air safety, "in forever changing the general approach used in transport accidents investigations world wide."

In 2009, Air New Zealand's CEO Rob Fyfe apologised to all those affected who did not receive appropriate support and compassion from the company following the incident, and unveiled a commemorative sculpture at its headquarters.

On 28 November 2019, the 40-year anniversary of the disaster, New Zealand Prime Minister Jacinda Ardern, along with the national government, issued a formal apology to the families of the victims. Ardern "[expressed] regret on behalf of Air New Zealand for the accident", and "[apologised] on behalf of the airline which 40 years ago failed in its duty of care to its passengers and staff."

The registration of the crashed aircraft, ZK-NZP, has not been reissued.

Memorials

A wooden cross was erected on the mountain above Scott Base to commemorate the accident. It was replaced in 1986 with an aluminium cross after the original was eroded by low temperatures, wind, and moisture.

The memorial for the 16 passengers who were unidentifiable and the 28 whose bodies were never found is at Waikumete Cemetery in Glen Eden, Auckland. Beside the memorial is a Japanese cherry tree, planted as a memorial to the 24 Japanese passengers who died on board Flight 901.

A memorial to the crew members of Flight 901 is located adjacent to Auckland Airport, on Tom Pearce Drive at the eastern end of the airport zone.

In January 2010, a  sculpted koru containing letters written by the loved ones of those who died was placed next to the Antarctic cross. It was originally to have been placed at the site by six relatives of the victims on the 30th anniversary of the crash, 28 November 2009, but this was delayed for two months due to bad weather. It was planned for a second koru capsule, mirroring the first capsule, to be placed at Scott Base in 2011.

The book-length poem "Erebus" by American writer Jane Summer (Sibling Rivalry Press, 2015) memorialises a close friend who died in the tragedy, and in a feat of 'investigative poetry', explores the chain of flawed decisions that caused the crash.

In 2019, it was announced that a national memorial is to be installed in Parnell Rose Gardens, with a relative of one of the crash victims stating that it was the right place. However, local residents criticised the memorial's location, saying that it would "destroy the ambiance of the park".

In popular culture
The crash coincided with the Air New Zealand Shell Open, a golf tournament sponsored by Air New Zealand. CEO Morrie Davis was playing the pro-am when he first heard word that the plane was "lost." Air New Zealand thought about cancelling the tournament but decided against it.

A television miniseries, Erebus: The Aftermath, focusing on the investigation and the Royal Commission of Inquiry, was broadcast in New Zealand and Australia in 1988.

The phrase "an orchestrated litany of lies" entered New Zealand popular culture for some years. "To quote a well-known phrase, there has been 'An orchestrated litany of lies'"

The disaster features in the fifth season-two episode of The Weather Channel documentary Why Planes Crash. The episode is titled "Sudden Impact", and was first aired in January 2015.

 Official records 

Material related to the Erebus disaster and inquiry is held (with other Antarctica items from the Antarctic Division of the (former) Department of Scientific and Industrial Research (DSIR)) by Archives New Zealand, Christchurch. There are 168 record items, of which twelve are restricted access (7 photos, 4 audio cassettes and 1 file of newspaper clippings from Air New Zealand).

Other files are held by Archives New Zealand at Auckland, Wellington, Christchurch and Dunedin. These include files of the Royal Commission (Agency AASJ, accession W2802)  and the New Zealand Police (Agencies AAAJ, BBAN; many are restricted).

 See also 
 Aviation accidents and incidents
 List of New Zealand disasters by death toll
 List of disasters in Antarctica by death toll
 Sensory illusions in aviation
 Tourism in Antarctica

Similar aircraft incidents
 American Airlines Flight 965, a flight which crashed into terrain after the pilots altered the coordinates.
 Aviateca Flight 901, a flight of the same number which also collided with a volcano.
 Prinair Flight 277
 Ansett New Zealand Flight 703
 New Zealand National Airways Corporation Flight 441
 Uruguayan Air Force Flight 571, another flight which crashed into terrain due to deviation from the planned flight route

 Notes 

 References 

 Further reading 

 NZAVA Operation Deep Freeze – The New Zealand Story, 2002.
 Operation Overdue–NZAVA Archives 2002.
 C.H.N. L'Estrange, The Erebus enquiry: a tragic miscarriage of justice, Auckland, Air Safety League of New Zealand, 1995
 Stuart Macfarlane, The Erebus papers: edited extracts from the Erebus proceedings with commentary, Auckland, Avon Press, 1991
 Report of the Royal Commission to Inquire into the Crash on Mount Erebus, Antarctica of a DC10 Aircraft Operated by Air New Zealand Limited (66 Mb file), Wellington, Government Printer, 1981 (located at Archives New Zealand; item number ABVX 7333 W4772/5025/3/79-139 part 3)
 R Chippendale, Air New Zealand McDonnell-Douglas DC10-30 ZK-NZP, Ross Island, Antarctica 28 November 1979, Office of Air Accidents Investigation, New Zealand Ministry of Transport, Wellington, 1980 (only some parts there)
 Air New Zealand History Page, including a section about Erebus

 External links 

 "New Zealand DC-10 lost with 257 on Antarctic sightseeing flight" the news of the crash as reported in Flight''
  
 The Erebus Story – Loss of TE901 (includes Newspaper Articles and Video footage) – New Zealand Air Line Pilots' Association
 Aviation Safety Network: Transcript of flight 901
 The original brochure advertising Air New Zealand flights to Antarctica
 Aircraft Accident Report No 79-139 Air New Zealand McDonnell-Douglas DC10-30 ZK-NZP Ross Island Antarctica 28 November 1979 – the official accident report ("The Chippendale Report")
 
 (audio file) ABC Radio National program "Ockham's Razor": "Arthur Marcell takes us through some of the events leading up to the crash and has a few questions for modern navigators." transcript
 NZ Special Service Medal (Erebus) 2006
 Erebus disaster (NZHistory.net.nz)–includes previously unpublished images and sound files
 Erebus Aircraft Accident–Christchurch City Libraries
 Erebus for Kids–This site is for young school children to provide information about the Erebus Tragedy.
 
 Erebus Disaster: Lookout – official TV New Zealand YouTube site with programme on the Royal Commission enquiry into the crash.
 Erebus Memorial: Erebus Memorial Names – official New Zealand Ministry for Culture & Heritage memorial site.
 BBC News: The plane crash that changed New Zealand

1979 in Antarctica
1979 in New Zealand
Airliner accidents and incidents involving controlled flight into terrain
Aviation accidents and incidents in 1979
Accidents and incidents involving the McDonnell Douglas DC-10
Air New Zealand accidents and incidents
Aviation accidents and incidents in Antarctica
Aviation accidents and incidents in New Zealand
Ross Island
Aviation accident investigations with disputed causes
1979 disasters in New Zealand
November 1979 events in New Zealand
History of the Ross Dependency